"Nobody" is a song by American hip hop recording artist Nas from his thirteenth studio album, King's Disease II (2021). The song was produced by Hit-Boy, and features an additional verses from fellow American rapper Lauryn Hill. The song was written by the latter three artists along with songwriters Dustin James Corbett and Joshua Strange. 

"Nobody" received positive reception from music critics, who praised Hill's verse. The song was named one of Barack Obama's favorite songs of 2021, and was nominated for Impact Track at the 2022 BET Hip Hop Awards.

Background 
"Nobody" marked the second musical collaboration between Nas and Lauryn Hill. They first worked together on the 1996 hit single "If I Ruled the World (Imagine That)". The two rappers also went on the road together for the Life Is Good/Black Rage tour, in 2012, and again on a joint tour in 2017. 

While Hill sang on their previous collaboration, on "Nobody" she gave an often times rare rap verse.

Music and lyrics 
Nas' verse discussed his desire to escape from the media spotlight: "If Chappelle moved to Ghana to find his peace, then I'm rollin/Where the service always roamin', I'm packin' my bags and goin'." During her verse, Hill explained her absence from the music Industry, with the lyrics: "They tried to box me out while takin' what they want from me/I spent too many years living too uncomfortably," while also defending her habit of arriving late to her own concerts: "My awareness like Keanu in The Matrix/I'm savin' souls and y'all complainin' 'bout my lateness."

Critical reception 
Upon its release the song began trending on social media, and received positive feedback from music critics. Dana Scott of HipHopDX, praised Nas' flow, comparing it to his previous acclaimed work.

Most fans and critics mentioned Hill's verse as the highlight of the song. Writing for NME, Will Lavin called the song a "glistening, esoteric gem", and referred to Hill's rhymes as a "lyrical master class". It was named one of the best songs released that week by Entertainment Weekly, who stated that Hill proved "she's still one of the best damn rappers alive"; while Will Schube of UDiscover Music, stated a similar sentiment. Rolling Stone argued that she "manages an impossible balance of fierce memory and unbotheredness" on the song, before proclaiming that she "absolutely levitates above the rap game, offering the learned vantage point of someone who has reached its mountaintop after a treacherous hike up."

Recognition 
Several media outlets declared Hill's contribution to "Nobody" as one of the best verses of 2021, Including BET, Okayplayer, and HipHopDX. Complex named it the second best verse of that year. Former United States president Barack Obama listed "Nobody" as one of his favorite songs of 2021.

Awards and nominations

Chart performance

References 

2021 songs
Nas songs
Lauryn Hill songs
Songs written by Nas
Song recordings produced by Hit-Boy
Songs written by Lauryn Hill
Songs written by Hit-Boy
Songs written by Kendrick Lamar